Athenagoras may refer to:

Athenagoras of Ephesus (6th century BC), a Greek tyrant of Ephesus
Athenagoras of Syracuse (5th century BC), a statesman and military leader in Syracuse during the Sicilian Expedition
Athenagoras of Macedon (2nd–3rd century BC), a general serving Philip V and Perseus
Saint Athenagoras of Athens a.k.a. Saint Athenagorus the Apologist (2nd century AD), early Christian philosopher
Patriarch Athenagoras (1886–1972), Patriarch of Constantinople
Athenagoras (Fell), a 1682 biography of Athenagoras of Athens by British theologian John Fell